Hopkins Beach is a hamlet in the town of Wilson in Niagara County, New York, United States.

References

Hamlets in New York (state)
Hamlets in Niagara County, New York
Populated places on Lake Ontario in the United States